Surinder Singh Kairon (8 December 1927 – 16 March 2009) was an Indian politician from Punjab. He was a member of Indian National Congress and represented Taran Taran in 10th Lok Sabha. He was son of ex-chief minister of Punjab, Partap Singh Kairon. He was a member of Punjab Vidhan Sabha before being elected to the Lok Sabha. His son Adesh Partap Singh Kairon is married to Parkash Singh Badal's daughter Preneet Kaur.  He died after suffering a massive cardiac arrest in Amritsar on 16 March 2009.

Early life
Surinder Singh Kairon was the son of ex-chief minister of Punjab, Pratap Singh Kairon. He was born on 8 December  1927 at Kairon Amritsar district.  He has done a B.Sc.(Hons) and M.A. from Panjab University, Chandigarh.

Political career
Kairon was a prominent political leader in Punjab and was considered a stalwart leader in the Majha area of Punjab. He was elected for Punjab Vidhan Sabha three times. In 1991, he became a member of 10th Lok Sabha and represented Tarn Taran.

Personal life
Kairon was married to Kusum Kumari. The couple had 3 sons, Adesh Partap Singh Kairon, Gurpartap Singh Kairon and Uday Singh Kairon. Adesh Partap is Minister of Food and Civil Supplies and IT in Punjab Government.

Death
Kairon died after suffering a massive cardiac arrest in Amritsar on 16 March 2009. He had suddenly collapsed after a regular evening walk. He was cremated in his native village Kairon.

References

India MPs 1991–1996
People from Amritsar district
Indian Sikhs
Indian National Congress politicians
Panjab University alumni
1927 births
2009 deaths
Lok Sabha members from Punjab, India
People from Tarn Taran Sahib